Lambdina laeta is a species of geometrid moth in the family Geometridae. It is found in North America.

The MONA or Hodges number for Lambdina laeta is 6891.

References

Further reading

 

Ourapterygini
Articles created by Qbugbot
Moths described in 1900